The men's 1500 metres at the 1966 European Athletics Championships was held in Budapest, Hungary, at Népstadion on 30 August and 1 September 1966.

Medalists

Results

Final
1 September

Heats
30 August

Heat 1

Heat 2

Heat 3

Participation
According to an unofficial count, 32 athletes from 20 countries participated in the event.

 (1)
 (2)
 (2)
 (1)
 (1)
 (3)
 (1)
 (1)
 (1)
 (1)
 (2)
 (3)
 (1)
 (3)
 (1)
 (1)
 (1)
 (2)
 (3)
 (1)

References

1500 metres
1500 metres at the European Athletics Championships